Ricardo Rodolfo Maduro Joest (born 20 April 1946 in Panama) is a Honduran politician who served as President of Honduras from 2002 to 2006. A member of the National Party, Maduro was previously chairman of the Central Bank of Honduras. He graduated from The Lawrenceville School (where he was awarded the Lawrenceville Medal, Lawrenceville's highest award to alumni) and later Stanford University. Maduro is a member of the Levy-Maduro family whose roots go through Portugal, the Netherlands and the Netherlands Antilles.

Life and career
Maduro's first marriage to Miriam Andréu produced three daughters and a son, Ricardo Ernesto, who was kidnapped at age 25 on 23 April 1997. Ricardo Ernesto's body was discovered two days later. His death inspired Maduro to aspire to the presidency and gave him the popularity that allowed him to first register and then be elected as a presidential candidate, in spite of a constitutional ban on those not born in Honduras from becoming President. This constitutional ban created great controversy before the 2001 elections. Having been chosen as the PNH candidate, he was eventually allowed to stand. In his campaign he promised to tackle crime and the Mara Salvatrucha gang (maras). He immediately brought troops out onto the streets of the larger cities to accompany the local police. The PNH-held National Congress passed laws making illicit association a crime, which have seen hundreds of gang members put behind bars.

In October 2002, Maduro married the Spaniard Aguas Santas Ocaña Navarro, whom he met when she was a member of the Spanish Embassy in Honduras. Shortly after he left office, Maduro and Ocaña filed for divorce. She consequently moved to Nicaragua with her adoptive children to direct a non-profit organization devoted to children. Maduro remained in Tegucigalpa.  Maduro's eldest son is a United States citizen and lives in the U.S.

On 1 May 2005 the plane Maduro was traveling in crashed into the Caribbean Sea off the shore of Tela. Maduro, his daughter Lorena, and the pilot were reportedly not seriously injured and were rescued by local residents. He was taken to a hospital in Comayagua to recover.

On 27 November 2005 Maduro presided over a new set of presidential and general elections. His party lost the presidency to the Liberal Party of Honduras (PLH) and its candidate Manuel Zelaya. Zelaya succeeded Maduro on 27 January 2006.

Maduro currently serves as President of Inversiones la Paz in Tegucigalpa, and is active in the education organization he created in honor of his son, the Fundacion para la Educacion Ricardo Ernesto Maduro Andreu, FEREMA. The organization is set up to give an education to lower income kindergarten students. Maduro believes that kindergarten is an instrumental part in a child’s life to be able to succeed academically.

Honors
Order of Brilliant Jade with Grand Cordon (Republic of China)

See also
History of Honduras
Politics of Honduras

External links
Biography by CIDOB (in Spanish)
 Biography at the Permanent Mission of the United Nations website.

References

1946 births
Living people
Presidents of Honduras
Presidents of the Central Bank of Honduras
Honduran economists
National Party of Honduras politicians
Honduran Roman Catholics
Stanford University alumni
Lawrenceville School alumni
Honduran expatriates in the United States